The President and Fellows of Harvard College (also called the Harvard Corporation or just the Corporation) is the smaller and more powerful of Harvard University's two governing boards, and the oldest corporation in the United States. Together with the Board of Overseers, the two boards exercise institutional roles more commonly consolidated into a board of trustees.

Although the institution it governs has grown into a university of which Harvard College is one component, the corporation's formal title remains "The President and Fellows of Harvard College".

History
In 1650, at the request of Harvard President Henry Dunster, the Great and General Court of Massachusetts issued the body's charter, making it the oldest corporation in what became the United States. The subsequent Constitution of the Commonwealth of Massachusetts confirmed that, despite the change in government due to the American Revolution, the corporation would continue to "have, hold, use, exercise and enjoy" its property and legal privileges.

The corporation was probably originally intended to be a body of the school's resident instructors, similar to the fellows of an Oxbridge college. However, it fell into the now-familiar American model of a governing board—an outside body whose members are not involved in the institution's daily life, which meets periodically to consult with the day-to-day head, the president (whom it appoints). The Corporation is self-perpetuating, appointing new members to fill its own vacancies as they arise. The Charter of 1650 established the Harvard Corporation board which consisted of seven members: a President, five Fellows, and a Treasurer. The Corporation had the authority to manage the College’s finances, real estate, and donations, act as a legal entity in courts of law, select officers and servants, and create orders and bylaws for the College, with the approval of the Board of Overseers.

The founding members of the Harvard Corporation were respectively:  Henry Dunster as President, Samuel Mather, Samuel Danforth, Jonathan Mitchell, Comfort Starr and Samuel Eaton as the five Fellows and Thomas Danforth as the Treasurer. These men had, in perpetual succession, the duties of managing the College.

For most of its history, the Corporation consisted of six fellows in addition to the president. But after the abortive presidency of Lawrence Summers and a large endowment decline in 2008–2009, a year-long governance review was conducted. In December 2010, it announced that the Corporation's  "composition, structure, and practices" would be greatly altered: the number of fellows would increase from six to twelve, with prescribed terms of service, and several new committees would endeavor to improve the group's integration with the activities of the University as a whole, especially its long-term planning.

Current Membership

There are currently thirteen members of the Corporation, including the University president, who sets the agenda but does not vote.

References

External links
 President and Fellows of Harvard College

Harvard University
Harvard College